Canice Michael Carroll (born 16 January 1999) is a professional footballer who plays as a midfielder for Oxford City. Carroll is a product of the Oxford United youth system and began his professional career with the club, before moving to Brentford in 2018. After loan spells at Swindon Town and Carlisle United and a short period with Stevenage, he moved to Scotland to join Queen's Park in 2020. Born in England, Carroll was capped by the Republic of Ireland at youth level and has played club football in England and Scotland.

Club career

Oxford United 
Adept as a central defender, full back or a midfielder, Carroll came through the youth system at hometown club Oxford United and began a scholarship in July 2015. His progression was such that he was offered a -year professional contract in August 2015 and signed it on 5 February 2016. Carroll made his debut for the club as a substitute for Alex MacDonald after 82 minutes of a 2–0 Football League Trophy Southern Area quarter-final victory over Dagenham & Redbridge on 11 November 2015. He did not feature in the remainder of Oxford's run to the 2016 Football League Trophy Final or in the club's promotion to League One, but was a part of the U18 team which finished the season as Football League Youth Alliance Merit League 2 champions.

Carroll made seven appearances during the 2016–17 season and was named as the Us' Young Player of the Year. He was an unused substitute during the 2–1 2017 EFL Trophy Final defeat to Coventry City at Wembley Stadium. Carroll signed a new three-year contract with the club in May 2017.

Carroll made something of a breakthrough during the 2017–18 season, making 17 appearances and scoring his only goal for the club, with a header in a 3–2 defeat to Bradford City on 30 December 2017. He departed the Us on 9 August 2018, having made 25 appearances and scored one goal during  seasons as a professional at the Kassam Stadium.

Brentford 
On 9 August 2018, Carroll signed a two-year contract with the B team at Championship club Brentford for an undisclosed fee, with the option of a further year. He featured regularly for the B team and was an unused substitute on one occasion for the first team before joining League Two club Swindon Town on loan until the end of the 2018–19 season in January 2019. Deployed predominantly as a defensive midfielder, Carroll made 17 appearances and scored one goal during his spell.

Despite being a member of the Brentford first team's Austrian training camp during the 2019–20 pre-season, Carroll joined League Two club Carlisle United on loan for the duration of the 2019–20 season. On 10 August 2019, his second match for the club, Carroll received the first red card of his career, for a "two-footed lunge" on Jordan Lyden during a 3–2 defeat to former club Swindon Town. The loan was ended on 31 January 2020, by which time he had made 16 appearances and scored one goal. Later that day, Carroll transferred away from Brentford.

Stevenage 
On 31 January 2020, Carroll transferred to League Two club Stevenage on a contract running until the end of the 2019–20 season. Prior to the season being ended early, he made four appearances and was released when his contract expired.

Queen's Park 
On 2 November 2020, Carroll signed a contract running until the end of the 2020–21 season with Scottish League Two club Queen's Park. He made his debut later that day in a 0–0 Glasgow Cup group stage draw with Rangers B. Carroll made 14 appearances during the remainder of the Spiders' Scottish League Two championship-winning season and was released when his contract expired.

Oxford City 
On 4 August 2021, Carroll signed a one-year contract with National League South club Oxford City. He made 28 appearances and scored two goals during a 2021–22 season which concluded with defeat in the National League South playoff semi-finals. Carroll signed a new one-year contract in June 2022.

International career 
Carroll has been capped by the Republic of Ireland at U17, U18 and U19 level. He was nominated for the International U17 Player of the Year award at the 2016 FAI International Football Awards. Carroll was named in the U21 squad for the 2019 Toulon Tournament and made one appearance in the tournament, with a start in a shootout defeat to Mexico U22 in the third place play-off.

Personal life 
Carroll attended Cherwell School.

Career statistics

Honours 
Queen's Park

 Scottish League Two: 2020–21

Oxford City

 Oxfordshire Senior Cup: 2021–22

Individual
 Oxford United Young Player of the Year: 2016–17

References

External links

Canice Carroll at fai.ie
Canice Carroll at oxfordcityfc.co.uk

Living people
1999 births
Republic of Ireland association footballers
Republic of Ireland youth international footballers
English footballers
English people of Irish descent
Association football defenders
Association football midfielders
Oxford United F.C. players
English Football League players
Brentford F.C. players
Footballers from Oxford
Swindon Town F.C. players
Republic of Ireland under-21 international footballers
Carlisle United F.C. players
Stevenage F.C. players
Queen's Park F.C. players
Scottish Professional Football League players
Oxford City F.C. players
National League (English football) players